The named mountain ranges of Utah.

Alphabetical
 Abajo Mountains
 Antelope Range (Iron County, Utah)
 Antelope Range (Juab County, Utah)
 Antelope Range (Sevier County, Utah)
 Aquarius Plateau, (* Boulder Mountain)
 Bear River Mountains, (Bear River Range)
 Beaver Dam Mountains
 Beaver Lake Mountains
 Black Mountains (Utah)
 Blue Spring Hills
 Buckskin Mountains (Arizona-Utah)
 Bull Valley Mountains
 Burbank Hills
 Canyon Mountains
 Cedar Mountains (Iron County, Utah)
 Cedar Mountains (Tooele County, Utah)
 Confusion Range
 Conger Range
 Crawford Mountains
 Cricket Mountains
 Deep Creek Mountains
 Drum Mountains
 Dugway Range
 East Tintic Mountains
 Escalante Mountains
 Fish Lake Plateau
 Fish Springs Range
 Gilson Mountains
 Goose Creek Mountains
 Grassy Mountains
 Grouse Creek Mountains
 Hansel Mountains
 Harmony Mountains
 Henry Mountains
 Hogup Mountains
 House Range
 Indian Peak Range
 La Sal Mountains
 Lake Mountains
 Lakeside Mountains
 Mahogany Mountains, (Nevada Border)
 Markagunt Plateau
 Mineral Mountains (Utah)
 Moccasin Mountains
 Monte Cristo Range (Utah)
 Mountain Home Range
 Needle Mountains (Nevada-Utah)
 Newfoundland Mountains
 Onaqui Mountains
 Oquirrh Mountains
 Pavant Range
 Pilot Range
 Pine Valley Mountains
 Promontory Mountains
 Raft River Mountains
 Red Mountains (Utah), (also a Red Mountains (Wyoming))
 Rubber Mountains
 San Francisco Mountains (Utah)
 San Pitch Mountains
 Sheeprock Mountains
 Silver Island Range, Utah
 Simpson Mountains
 Stansbury Mountains
 Star Range
 Swasey Mountain, (the north section of the House Range)
 Tavaputs Plateau, (* Roan Cliffs)
 Traverse Ridge
 Thomas Range
 Tunnel Springs Mountains
 Tushar Mountains
 Uinta Mountains
 Valley Mountains
 Wah Wah Mountains
 Wasatch Plateau
 Wasatch Range
 Wellsville Mountains
 West Hills (Box Elder County, Utah)
 West Hills (Juab County, Utah)

By county
The listing, with county designations.

Beaver County
 Black Mountains (Utah), Iron-Beaver
 Indian Peak Range, Beaver-Iron
 Mineral Mountains (Utah), Beaver
 Mountain Home Range, Beaver-Millard
 San Francisco Mountains (Utah), Beaver-Millard
 Star Range (Utah), Beaver
 Tushar Mountains, Beaver-Piute-Sevier
 Wah Wah Mountains, Beaver-Millard-Iron

Box Elder County
 Blue Spring Hills, Box Elder
 Goose Creek Mountains, Box Elder
 Grouse Creek Mountains, Box Elder
 Hansel Mountains, Box Elder
 Hogup Mountains, Box Elder
 Lakeside Mountains, Tooele-Box Elder
 Newfoundland Mountains, Box Elder
 Pilot Range, Box Elder-(Elko County, NV)
 Promontory Mountains, Box Elder
 Raft River Mountains, Box Elder
 Silver Island Range, Utah, Box Elder
 Wasatch Range: (north to south), Cache-Box Elder-Weber-Morgan-Davis-Salt Lake-Summit-Wasatch-Utah-Juab-Sanpete
 Wellsville Mountains, Box Elder-Cache
 West Hills (Box Elder County, Utah), Box Elder-(Samaria Mountains, Idaho-(north))

Cache County
 Bear River Mountains, Cache-Weber-(Franklin, Co., ID)
 Monte Cristo Range (Utah), Cache-Rich
 Wasatch Range: (north to south), Cache-Box Elder-Weber-Morgan-Davis-Salt Lake-Summit-Wasatch-Utah-Juab-Sanpete
 Wellsville Mountains, Box Elder-Cache

Carbon County
 Tavaputs Plateau, (west to east), Wasatch-Utah-Duschesne-Carbon-Emery-Uintah-(Rio Blanco Co., CO)-(Garfield Co., CO)-(Mesa Co., CO)
 Wasatch Plateau, Utah-Sanpete-Carbon-Emery-Sevier

Daggett County
 Uinta Mountains, (west to east), Wasatch-Summit-Duchesne-(Uinta Co., WY)-Daggett-Uintah-(Moffat Co., CO)

Davis County
 Wasatch Range: (north to south), Cache-Box Elder-Weber-Morgan-Davis-Salt Lake-Summit-Wasatch-Utah-Juab-Sanpete

Duchesne County
 Uinta Mountains, (west to east), Wasatch-Summit-Duchesne-(Uinta Co., WY)-Daggett-Uintah-(Moffat Co., CO)

Emery County
 (San Rafael Swell), Emery
 Tavaputs Plateau, (west to east), Wasatch-Utah-Duschesne-Carbon-Emery-Uintah-(Rio Blanco Co., CO)-(Garfield Co., CO)-(Mesa Co., CO)
 Wasatch Plateau, Utah-Sanpete-Carbon-Emery-Sevier

Garfield County
 Aquarius Plateau, Paiute-Wayne-Garfield
 Escalante Mountains, Garfield
 Henry Mountains, Garfield-Wayne
 Markagunt Plateau, Iron-Garfield-Washington-Kane
 Tavaputs Plateau, (west to east), Wasatch-Utah-Duschesne-Carbon-Emery-Uintah-(Rio Blanco Co., CO)-(Garfield Co., CO)-(Mesa Co., CO)

Grand County
 La Sal Mountains, Grand-San Juan

Iron County
 Antelope Range (Iron County, Utah), Iron
 Black Mountains (Utah), Iron-Beaver
 Cedar Mountains (Iron County, Utah), Iron
 Harmony Mountains, Iron-Washington
 Indian Peak Range, Beaver-Iron
 Mahogany Mountains, Iron-(Lincoln County, NV)
 Markagunt Plateau, Iron-Garfield-Washington-Kane
 Needle Mountains (Nevada-Utah), Iron-(Lincoln County, NV)

Juab County
 Antelope Range (Juab County, Utah), Juab
 Canyon Mountains, Millard-Juab
 Confusion Range, Millard-(Juab)
 Deep Creek Mountains, Juab-Tooele
 Disappointment Hills, Juab-Millard
 Drum Mountains, Millard-Juab
 Dugway Range, Tooele-Juab
 Fish Springs Range, Juab
 Gilson Mountains, Juab
 House Range, Millard-Juab
 San Pitch Mountains, Juab-Sanpete
 Sheeprock Mountains, Tooele-Juab
 Simpson Mountains, Tooele-Juab
 Thomas Range, Juab
 Valley Mountains, Sanpete-Sevier-Millard-Juab
 West Hills (Juab County, Utah), Juab
 West Tintic Mountains, Juab-Tooele

Kane County
 Buckskin Mountains (Arizona-Utah), Kane & Coconino County, AZ
 Markagunt Plateau, Iron-Garfield-Washington-Kane
 Moccasin Mountains, Mohave County, AZ and Kane County

Millard County
 Burbank Hills, Millard
 Canyon Mountains, Millard-Juab
 Confusion Range, Millard-(Juab)
 Conger Range, Millard
 Cricket Mountains, Millard
 Disappointment Hills, Juab-Millard
 Drum Mountains, Millard-Juab
 House Range, Millard-Juab
 Mountain Home Range, Beaver-Millard
 Pavant Range, Millard-Sevier
 San Francisco Mountains (Utah), Beaver-Millard
 Swasey Mountain, (the north section of the House Range), Millard
 Tunnel Springs Mountains, Millard
 Valley Mountains, Sanpete-Sevier-Millard-Juab
 Wah Wah Mountains, Beaver-Millard-Iron

Morgan County
 Wasatch Range: (north to south), Cache-Box Elder-Weber-Morgan-Davis-Salt Lake-Summit-Wasatch-Utah-Juab-Sanpete

Piute County
 Tushar Mountains, Beaver-Piute-Sevier

Rich County
 Crawford Mountains, Rich-(Lincoln Co., WY)
 Monte Cristo Range (Utah), Cache-Rich

Salt Lake County
 Oquirrh Mountains, Utah-Salt Lake
 Wasatch Range: (north to south), Cache-Box Elder-Weber-Morgan-Davis-Salt Lake-Summit-Wasatch-Utah-Juab-Sanpete

San Juan County
 Abajo Mountains, San Juan
 La Sal Mountains, Grand-San Juan

Sanpete County
 San Pitch Mountains, Juab-Sanpete
 Valley Mountains, Sanpete-Sevier-Millard-Juab
 Wasatch Plateau, Utah-Sanpete-Carbon-Emery-Sevier
 Wasatch Range: (north to south), Cache-Box Elder-Weber-Morgan-Davis-Salt Lake-Summit-Wasatch-Utah-Juab-Sanpete

Sevier County
 Antelope Range (Sevier County, Utah), Sevier
 Fish Lake Plateau, Sevier-Paiute-Wayne
 Pavant Range, Millard-Sevier
 Tushar Mountains, Beaver-Piute-Sevier
 Valley Mountains, Sanpete-Sevier-Millard-Juab
 Wasatch Plateau, Utah-Sanpete-Carbon-Emery-Sevier

Summit County
 Uinta Mountains, (west to east), Wasatch-Summit-Duchesne-(Uinta Co., WY)-Daggett-Uintah-(Moffat Co., CO)
 Wasatch Range: (north to south), Cache-Box Elder-Weber-Morgan-Davis-Salt Lake-Summit-Wasatch-Utah-Juab-Sanpete

Tooele County
 Cedar Mountains (Tooele County, Utah), Tooele
 Deep Creek Mountains, Juab-Tooele
 Dugway Range, Tooele-Juab
 East Tintic Mountains, Utah-Tooele
 Grassy Mountains, Tooele
 Lakeside Mountains, Tooele-Box Elder
 Onaqui Mountains, Tooele
 Sheeprock Mountains, Tooele-Juab
 Simpson Mountains, Tooele-Juab
 Silver Island Mountains, Juab-Tooele
 Stansbury Mountains, Tooele
 West Tintic Mountains, Juab-Tooele

Uintah County
 Tavaputs Plateau, (west to east), Wasatch-Utah-Duschesne-Carbon-Emery-Uintah-(Rio Blanco Co., CO)-(Garfield Co., CO)-(Mesa Co., CO)
 Uinta Mountains, (west to east), Wasatch-Summit-Duchesne-(Uinta Co., WY)-Daggett-Uintah-(Moffat Co., CO)

Utah County
 East Tintic Mountains, Utah-Tooele
 Lake Mountains, Utah
 Oquirrh Mountains, Utah-Salt Lake
 Tavaputs Plateau, (west to east), Wasatch-Utah-Duschesne-Carbon-Emery-Uintah-(Rio Blanco Co., CO)-(Garfield Co., CO)-(Mesa Co., CO)
 Wasatch Plateau, Utah-Sanpete-Carbon-Emery-Sevier
 Wasatch Range: (north to south), Cache-Box Elder-Weber-Morgan-Davis-Salt Lake-Summit-Wasatch-Utah-Juab-Sanpete

Wasatch County
 Tavaputs Plateau, (west to east), Wasatch-Utah-Duschesne-Carbon-Emery-Uintah-(Rio Blanco Co., CO)-(Garfield Co., CO)-(Mesa Co., CO)
 Uinta Mountains, (west to east), Wasatch-Summit-Duchesne-(Uinta Co., WY)-Daggett-Uintah-(Moffat Co., CO)
 Wasatch Range: (north to south), Cache-Box Elder-Weber-Morgan-Davis-Salt Lake-Summit-Wasatch-Utah-Juab-Sanpete

Washington County
 Beaver Dam Mountains, Washington
 Bull Valley Mountains, Washington
 Harmony Mountains, Iron-Washington
 Markagunt Plateau, Iron-Garfield-Washington-Kane
 Pine Valley Mountains, Washington
 Red Mountains (Utah), Washington

Wayne County
 Aquarius Plateau, Paiute-Wayne-Garfield
 Fish Lake Plateau, Sevier-Paiute-Wayne
 Henry Mountains, Garfield-Wayne

Weber County
 Bear River Mountains, Cache-Weber-(Franklin, Co., ID)
 Wasatch Range: (north to south), Cache-Box Elder-Weber-Morgan-Davis-Salt Lake-Summit-Wasatch-Utah-Juab-Sanpete

Ranges and related landforms

 Abajo Mountains
 Abajo Peak
 Aquarius Plateau
 Boulder Mountain (Utah)
 Thousand Lake Mountain
 Bear River Mountains
 Logan Peak
 Naomi Peak
 Cedar Mountains (Tooele County, Utah)
 Cedar Mountain Wilderness
 Confusion Range
 Conger Mountain
 Conger Range, Millard
 Henry Mountains
 Mount Ellen (Utah)
 House Range
 Sawtooth Mountain
 Notch Peak Wilderness Study Area
 Notch Peak
 Swasey Mountain
 La Sal Mountains
 Mount Peale
 Lake Mountains
 Oquirrh Mountains
 Farnsworth Peak
 Pine Valley Mountains
 Signal Peak
 Red Mountains (Utah)
 Snow Canyon State Park
 Stansbury Mountains
 Deseret Peak Wilderness
 Deseret Peak

 Tushar Mountains
 Delano Peak
 Uinta Mountains
 Bald Mountain (Utah)
 Bald Mountain Pass
 Hayden Peak (Utah)
 Humpy Peak
 High Uintas Wilderness
 Kings Peak
 Mount Agassiz (Utah)
 Wasatch Range
 Ben Lomond Mountain (Utah)
 Ensign Peak
 Francis Peak
 Granite Mountain (Utah)
 Lone Peak Wilderness
 Lone Peak
 Mount Nebo (Utah)
 Mount Ogden
 Mount Olympus (Utah)
 Mount Timpanogos Wilderness
 Mount Timpanogos
 Mount Van Cott
 Mount Wire
 Pfeifferhorn
 Twin Peaks (Salt Lake County, Utah)
 American Fork Twin Peaks 
 Broads Fork Twin Peaks
 Avenues Twin Peaks
 West Mountain (Utah County, Utah)
 Y Mountain

See also
 List of plateaus and mesas of Utah
 List of rivers of Utah
 List of valleys of Utah

References

 DeLorme. Utah Atlas & Gazetteer, DeLorme, c. 2010, 64 pp.

External links

 
Utah, List of mountain ranges of
Mountain ranges
Utah